Sameer is a male given name.

Sameer may also refer to:

People
 Sameer (lyricist) or Sameer Anjaan (born 1958), an Indian lyricist
 Sameer Gadhia, American singer, lead vocals for Young the Giant
 Sameer Hasan, Indian actor
 Sameer Dattani, Indian actor
 Sameer Dharmadhikari, Indian actor
 Sameer Hasan, Indian Telugu actor
 Sameer Rahim, British literary journalist and novelist
 Sameer Rajda, Indian gujarati actor
 Sameer Verma, Indian badminton player

Others
 Sameer (film), a 2017 Bollywood film
 Sameer Cup 1996–97, a cricket tournament held in Kenya
 Sameer Group, a large conglomerate based in Kenya

See also
 Sameera (disambiguation)
 Samir, a given name